Harold Clarence Whitehouse (January 31, 1884 - September, 1974) was an American architect based in Spokane, Washington.

A native of Massachusetts, Whitehouse moved to Spokane in 1906.  He worked for a time in the office of John K. Dow and then formed a partnership with George Keith.  He then left Spokane to study architecture at Cornell University.  He graduated from Cornell in 1913.  With fellow Cornell architecture graduate Ernest V. Price, he formed a partnership, the firm Whitehouse & Price, in 1913.  He was elected to the American Institute of Architects College of Fellows in 1959 and won the Allied Art Award in 1961.

Works of Whitehouse or the firm (with attribution) include:
Benewah Milk Bottle, S. 321 Cedar Spokane, WA (Whitehouse & Price), NRHP-listed
Cathedral of St. John the Evangelist, Spokane, Washington
Chamber of Commerce Building, 9 S. Washington St., Spokane, WA.
Christ Episcopal Church, 210 Fifth St. SW. Puyallup, WA (Whitehouse, Harold C.), NRHP-listed
Cordova Theater, 135 N. Grand Ave. Pullman, WA (Whitehouse & Price), NRHP-listed
 Culmstock Arms Apartments.
Dover Church, Washington between Third and Fourth Dover, ID (Whitehouse & Price), NRHP-listed
 Eastern State Hospital.
Farragut Naval Training Station (650 buildings), Lake Pend Oreille, Bayview, Idaho.
John A. Finch Memorial Nurses Home, N. 852 Summit Blvd. Spokane, WA (Whitehouse & Price), NRHP-listed
Hutton Settlement (a complex of neo-Tudor cottages), 9907 Wellesley Spokane, WA (Whitehouse, Harold C.), NRHP-listed
 Lincoln Building, corner of Lincoln and Riverside, Spokane, WA.
One or more works in Millwood Historic District, roughly bounded by Argonne and Sargent Rds., and by Euclid and Liberty Aves. Millwood, WA (Whitehouse, Harold), NRHP-listed 
Rosebush House, 3318 N. Marguerite Rd. Millwood, WA (Whitehouse, Harold), NRHP-listed
Sandpoint High School, 102 S. Euclid Ave. Sandpoint, ID (Whitehouse & Price), NRHP-listed
 St. Peter's Cathedral, Helena, Montana.
 St. Thomas Church, Medina, Washington
 University of Washington Music Building.
 Washington State University Chemistry Building.
West Valley High School, N. 2805 Argonne Rd. Millwood, WA (Whitehouse & Price), NRHP-listed

In September 1974, Whitehouse died at age 90 in a Spokane convalescent center.  Whitehouse's papers, including original drawings, are housed at the Eastern Washington State Historical Society.

See also
Morris H. Whitehouse and Whitehouse & Fouilhoux, architects of Oregon

References

1851 births
1925 deaths
20th-century American architects
Cornell University alumni
Fellows of the American Institute of Architects